China CITIC Bank Mansion, formerly Zhong Tian Plaza is a 59-floor/229-meter tall skyscraper in Ürümqi, Xinjiang, People's Republic of China. It is the tallest building in Northwestern China It was noted for having a similar design to One Liberty Place in Philadelphia, Pennsylvania, US.

See also
 List of tallest buildings in China

References

Buildings and structures in Ürümqi